Vallabhnagar is a village in Vallabhnagar tehsil of Udaipur district of Rajasthan, India. The administrative headquarters of the tehsil are located in Vallabhnagar.

The historical name of Vallabhnagar was Unthala. The population of Vallabhnagar is 8,053.

References

Villages in Udaipur district
Former capital cities in India